Île-de-France tramway Line 9 (usually called simply T9 and formerly known as Tramway Porte de Choisy - Orly Ville or TPO) is a tram line which is a part of the modern tram network of the Île-de-France region of France. Line T9 connects Porte de Choisy Paris Métro station and the centre of Orly (Place Gaston Viens) serving suburbs in the south-east of Paris. Line T9 will not serve Orly Airport though which is currently served by line T7. The line opened to the public on 10 April 2021.

Project objectives 
The main goal of the project is to desaturate existing transit lines, and in particular RATP bus route 183 (Porte de Choisy - Aéroport d'Orly Terminal Sud) which became the second busiest bus route in the Île-de-France region after route TVM, and to propose a public transport offer with more capacity, better performance, more regularity and more comfort, thanks to the adoption of a tramway. Additional project objectives are to accompany the evolution and development of a fast-changing suburban environment, the encouragement of sustainable mobility, better links between existing transit infrastructures and the refiguration of roads and public spaces (introduction of bike lines along the tram alignment, more accessible walking paths, etc.).

Tram line T9 offers connections to line T3a and Paris Métro Line 7 at Porte de Choisy Paris Métro station, with RER C at Choisy-le-Roi station and at Les Saules station as well as with various bus routes including routes TVM and 393 at Choisy-le-Roi. In the future the line will be connected  with Paris Métro line 15, part of the Grand Paris Express, at Vitry Centre.

Operation

Contract 
The line is the Île-de-France tram network's first line which is not directly awarded for management to either RATP or SNCF. The line's operations and maintenance contract is subject to competitive tendering by Île-de-France Mobilités (IDFM). In May 2018, IDFM issued a concession notice for operations and maintenance of line T9 including seven bus lines of the local "Bord de l'Eau" bus network for a period of 66 months (i.e. for only 5½ years), calling for potential candidates to submit a request for qualification.
IDFM allowed four candidates to bid: RATP Dev, Keolis, Transdev and outsider Moventia of Spain. On 14 June 2019 IDFM announced Keolis as the preferred bidder for T9 and the "Bord de l'Eau" bus network. The choice of Keolis was confirmed by IDFM on 2 July 2019.

Notes and references 

Line 9
Standard gauge railways in France
Railway lines opened in 1992
1992 establishments in France